Power over may refer to various forms of powering devices over data links:

 Power over eSATA (eSATAp), a variant of eSATA also delivering power over the same cable (but not the same wires inside the cable)
 Power over Ethernet (PoE), a method to power devices over their Ethernet cable (shared wires for data and power)
 Power over fiber (PoF), delivering power over optical (data) links (shared fibers for data and power)
 Power over LAN, a PoE-predecessor originally by PowerDsine, now Microsemi (shared wires for data and power)

See also
 1-Wire, an electrical interface for power and data transmission over two wires
 Phantom power, shared wires for analog electrical signals and power
 Power-line communication (PLC), data transmission over mains power supply
 PoweredUSB, a proprietary high power delivering variant of USB
 USB Power Delivery Specification (USB PD), high power delivery over (standard) USB
 Wireless power transfer (WPT), energy transmission via magnetic fields or electromagnetic waves
 Overpower